FLYEST is a passenger charter airline brand, established on 31 August 2015 by Estonian cargo airline Airest.  The company slogan is Bringing Aviation To People.

History
On 31 August 2015, FLYEST's first aircraft SAAB 340 ES-LSF started flying for Estonian Air on a Stockholm – Tallinn – Saint Petersburg route. On 7 November 2015, in connection with the bankruptcy of Estonian Air, Airest is no longer flying on Stockholm – Tallinn – Petersburg route. Airest was also operating on lines to Oslo and Vilnius.

Fleet 

1 Saab 340A registered ES-LSF. 33-seat aircraft.

External links

References 

Airlines of Estonia
Airlines established in 2015
2015 establishments in Estonia
Companies based in Tallinn